State Route 261 (SR 261) is a north–south secondary state highway that is located entirely in Macon County in Middle Tennessee. The route’s length is an estimated .

Route description 
SR 261's southern terminus is located in Lafayette at a junction with SR 52.

SR 261 travels northeastward while being known as Galen Road, traversing the unincorporated community of Galen. Its northern terminus is the point where it becomes the second segment of Kentucky Route 87 (KY 87) at the Kentucky state line in southern Monroe County near Bugtussle. KY 87’s main segment is accessible from SR 261 via Driver Road and Akersville Road north of Lafayette.

Major intersections

References 

261
261